When Love Is Not Enough: The Lois Wilson Story is a 2010 American film that premiered on CBS on April 25, 2010. The film was produced by Terry Gould, directed by John Kent Harrison and written by William G. Borchert, who based the script on his 2005 novel of the same name.

Plot
In 1914 Lois Burnham, a college-educated woman from an affluent family, meets and falls in love with Bill Wilson, a 19 year old man of modest means. They marry in 1918 and after his return from World War I, the two set out to build a life together.

While Lois works as a nurse Bill struggles to find his niche. Lois believes that Bill is destined for greatness and despite his increasing reliance on alcohol, she showers him with love and support.

Eventually, Lois persuades a friend’s husband to hire Bill at his financial firm; by 1927, Bill is working on Wall Street and the couple lives a luxurious lifestyle, but despite Lois’s valiant efforts to control his drinking, Bill’s alcoholism spirals out of control. Soon his job, their lifestyle, and their dreams are all gone.

In 1935, after years of struggling to cover for Bill and trying desperately to manage his disease by herself, Lois finally sees him get and stay sober – not through her help, but from the support of a fellow alcoholic, Dr. Bob Smith.

As Bill and Bob attain lasting sobriety and co-found Alcoholics Anonymous, Lois begins to feel neglected. Bill manages to stay sober without her help and she now feels isolated and resentful.

Lois soon discovers she is not alone in her isolation and anger, that there is a vast number of people whose lives and relationships have been devastated because a loved one is an alcoholic or drug addict. To help herself and others like her, she co-founds Al-Anon in 1951.

Cast
 Winona Ryder as Lois Wilson
 Barry Pepper as Bill Wilson
 John Bourgeois as Dr. Clark Burnham
Frank Moore as Dr. Bob Smith
 Rosemary Dunsmore as Matilda Burnham
 Ellen Dubin as Dora
Adam Greydon Reid as Ebby Thacher
 Rick Roberts as Frank Shaw

Production
When Love Is Not Enough: The Lois Wilson Story is the 240th presentation by Hallmark Hall of Fame, the long-running anthology program of American television films. It was based on a novel The Lois Wilson Story: When Love Is Not Enough by William Borchert, which was published September 17, 2005.  The film was set primarily in the United States but filmed in Canada.

Reception
The film was given mixed reviews by critics.  It was released on DVD in Hallmark stores in the United States.

In its original American broadcast on April 25, 2010, When Love is Not Enough was seen by 7.29 million viewers, according to MediaWeek.  It was out performed during the same time slot by both Brothers & Sisters and Celebrity Apprentice.

Linda Stasi in the New York Post wrote; "Everyone does a wonderful job in this movie -- but, in the end, it seems more like a rehash of writer William G. Borchert's 1989 'Hall of Fame' movie, My Name Is Bill W. than a real portrait of the woman whose idea helped millions of suffering families."

Mathew Gilbert in The Boston Globe wrote; "This new CBS Hallmark movie does its job effectively enough, bringing us through the ups and downs of Bill and Lois Wilson's marriage as they wrestle with his addiction."

Awards and nominations
The film has been nominated for several awards:

Screen Actors Guild Awards
 Screen Actors Guild Award for Outstanding Performance by a Female Actor in a Miniseries or Television Movie - Winona Ryder

Satellite Awards
 Satellite Award for Best Actor – Miniseries or Television Film - Barry Pepper 
 Satellite Award for Best Actress – Miniseries or Television Film - Winona Ryder 
 Satellite Award for Best Television Film - 

Emmy Awards
Emmy Award for Music Composition for a Miniseries, Movie, or Special - Lawrence Shragge

References

External links
Hallmark Hall of Fame homepage

Hallmark Hall of Fame episodes
2010 television films
2010 films
Films about alcoholism
CBS network films
Films directed by John Kent Harrison
Films based on American novels